The 1924 United States Senate election in Kentucky took place on November 4, 1924. Incumbent Democratic Senator Augustus Owsley Stanley ran for re-election to a second term, but was defeated by Republican Frederic M. Sackett.

General election

Candidates
Frederic M. Sackett, director of the Federal Reserve Bank branch of Louisville (Republican)
Augustus Owsley Stanley, incumbent Senator since 1919 (Democratic)

Results

See also
1924 United States Senate elections

Notes

References 

1924
Kentucky
United States Senate